Pedestrianism was a 19th-century form of competitive walking, often professional and funded by wagering, from which the modern sport of racewalking developed.

18th- and early 19th-century Britain

During the late eighteenth and nineteenth centuries, pedestrianism, like running or horse racing (equestrianism) was a popular spectator sport in Britain and Ireland. Pedestrianism became a fixture at fairs – much like horse racing – developing from wagers on footraces, rambling, and 17th-century footman wagering.  Sources from the late 17th and early 18th century in England describe aristocrats pitting their carriage footmen, constrained to walk by the speed of their masters' carriages, against one another.

The first notable exponent of this long-distance walking is generally considered to be Foster Powell (1734–93) who in 1773 walked  from London to York and back, and in 1788 walked  in 21 hours 35 minutes. By the end of the 18th century, and especially with the growth of the popular press, feats of foot travel over great distances (similar to a modern Ultramarathon) gained attention, and were labelled "pedestrianism".

Distance feats and wagering
One of the most famous pedestrians of the day was Captain Robert Barclay Allardice, called "The Celebrated Pedestrian", of Stonehaven. His most impressive feat was to walk  every hour for 1000 hours, which he achieved between 1 June and 12 July 1809. The feat captured the public's imagination and around 10,000 people came to watch over the course of the event. During the 19th century, attempts to repeat the athletic challenge were made by many pedestrians, including George Wilson who attempted to walk  in 480 hours in 1815 but was arrested after 3/4 of the distance for disturbing the peace. Later racewalkers proved to be more successful, especially Ada Anderson, who after walking  in 1000 hours was labelled by the press 'Champion Lady Walker of the World', a feat only equalled by one other, her trainer William Gale.
Another popular goal was for competitors in long-distance events to walk  in less than 24 hours, from which they earned the nickname "centurions".  Enormous cash prizes were offered for the races and they were a popular activity for the press, crowds of working class spectators, and the betting public until the 1880s.

Growth and controversy
Interest in the sport, and the wagering that accompanied it, spread to the United States, Canada, and Australia in the 19th century. By the end of the 19th century, pedestrianism was largely displaced by the rise in modern spectator sports and by controversy involving rules, which limited its appeal as a source of wagering and led to its inclusion in the amateur athletics movement and eventually the creation of racewalking.

Heel-to-toe rule
Pedestrianism was first codified in the latter half of the 19th century, evolving into what became racewalking, while diverging from the long-distance cross country fell running, other track and field athletics, and recreational hiking or hillwalking.  By the mid-19th century, competitors were often expected to extend their legs straight at least once in their stride and obey what was called the "fair heel and toe" rule.  This rule, the source of modern racewalking, was a vague commandment that the toe of one foot could not leave the ground before the heel of the next foot touched down; however, rules were customary and changed with competition.  Racers were usually allowed to jog in order to fend off cramps, and it was distance, not code, which determined gait for longer races. Newspaper reports suggest that "trotting" was common in events.

Heyday

The longer form of "ultra marathon" walking featured in the popular press and in the decade after the American Civil War in the United States was a source of fascination. Edward Payson Weston, a reporter for the New York Herald won a $10,000 prize by walking  from Portland, Maine, to Chicago in 30 days in 1867. In the United States a series of women's competitions were staged, special indoor tracks were built in some towns, and intra-community long distance pedestrianism came into vogue. American Elsa von Blumen competed as a pedestrian in events where she would walk 100 miles. Frank Hart was among the first African-American national sports celebrities for his achievements in the sport, such as setting a new 565 mile record in the 6 Day Race distance. Along with sensational feats of distance, gambling was a central attraction for the large, mostly working-class crowds which came to pedestrian events.

In the United Kingdom, member of Parliament Sir John Astley founded a "Long Distance Championship of the World" in 1878, staged over six days, which became known as the "Astley Belt Races". While marking a peak in press coverage of such races, the Astley Belt Races allowed a wide interpretation of rules, with trotting, jogging, and even some running allowed.  The competition was partly inspired by a desire to clean up the perception of the sport as corrupted by gambling interests and led to a push amongst some to codify pedestrianism as an amateur sport.  The same process was happening to British track and field athletics and gave rise to the modern Olympic Movement.

Amateur sport and racewalking
Walkers organised the first English amateur walking championship in 1866, which was won by John Chambers, and judged by the "fair heel and toe" rule.  This vague code was the basis for the rules codified at the first championships meeting in 1880 of the Amateur Athletics Association in England, the birth of modern track and field.  With football, cricket and other sports codified in the 19th century, the transition from professional pedestrianism to amateur codified racewalking was part of a process of regularisation occurring in most modern sports at this time.

The codified racewalk was included when the International Olympic Committee formed in 1893. In the 1904 Olympic Games the "all-rounder" event, father of the decathlon, included an  walk. It was only in the unofficial "Interim Olympic Games" of 1906 that racewalking became a separate event and since the 1908 Olympic Games in London, it has been an official event in every summer games.

Foot racing
Foot racing was a form of competitive running and walking of the 17th and early 18th centuries.  Usually it involved feats of endurance which would now be classified as ultramarathon.  It evolved into pedestrianism.

See also

 Bertha von Hillern
 George Littlewood
 Len Hurst
 Multi-day race

References

Further reading
Phil Howell. A brief history of racewalking in the United States, Reprinted in Run the Planet (n.d.) and originally credited to "Walk Talk", the Walking Club of Georgia, (1996). Archived from the original on 6 October 2013.
Tim Erickson.  A Potted History of the Rules of Racewalking, 24 June 2004.
Popular Recreation and The Rationalisation of Various Sports, Shelfield Sports & Community College, Walsall, England (n.d.). Archived from the original on 7 March 2008.
John Henry Walsh. Manual of British Rural Sports: Comprising Shooting, Hunting, Coursing, Fishing, Hawking, Racing, Boating, Pedestrianism, and the Various Rural Games and Amusements of Great Britain. Routledge, Warne & Routledge, London (1867)
https://www.austultrahistory.com/p/pedestrian-history.html  Australian Pedestrian History – Phil Essam

Racewalking
Athletics in the United Kingdom
Sports originating in the United Kingdom
19th century in sports